The Holy Catholic Church (Anglican Rite) (also known as the Anglican Rite Catholic Church or HCC-AR) is a body of Christians in the Continuing Anglican movement. It is represented by Dioceses and Missionary Jurisdictions in the United States of America, Latin America, and India.

History
The Holy Catholic Church (Anglican Rite) is part of the larger continuing Anglican movement that grew out of the 1977 Congress of St. Louis. The Congress produced the "Affirmation of St. Louis" which continues to stand as the statement of principles for the Holy Catholic Church (Anglican Rite).

In the United States, the denomination has only six congregations in as many states.

Founding and Apostolic Succession
In 1991, the Anglican Catholic Church, a Continuing Anglican body led at the time by Archbishop Louis Falk, split over its merger agreement with the American Episcopal Church. Parishes that refused the merger, a majority, continued under the name Anglican Catholic Church, Original Province (ACC-OP). The Apostolic Succession of the bishops of the Holy Catholic Church (Anglican Rite) can be traced back to the Anglican succession maintained in the original consecrations of Continuing Anglicans. This succession includes the following bishops: the Right Reverend Albert A. Chambers, the Right Reverend Francisco Pagtakhan, the Right Reverend Charles Doren, and the Right Reverend Robert S. Morse.

Western Rite Conflict
In 1997, a succession dispute arose among the bishops of the ACC-OP, which led to the formation of the Holy Catholic Church Anglican Rite. In March of that year Archbishop William Lewis, Metropolitan of the ACC-OP, suffered a stroke, an event which led to questions about his ability to continue in his post.  Thereafter a dispute arose regarding whether Thomas Kleppinger or John Cahoon was the Senior Bishop Ordinary in line to become Acting Metropolitan upon the death or disability of Lewis.

In June 1997, Lewis submitted the question to the ACC-OP's Provincial Court. An attempted settlement of the issue in July fell apart at a meeting of the bishops on August 4, which ended abruptly.  The next day, Bishops James McNeley, Arthur Seeland, and Leslie Hamlett announced that Archbishop Lewis was incapacitated and declared Bishop Kleppinger Acting Metropolitan.  On August 6, Kleppinger, Hamlett, and Seeland called on the bishops, clergy, and lay members of the church to repudiate "Traditional Episcopalians". Kleppinger signed the letter under the title of Acting Metropolitan, also joined later by bishops McNeley and Alexander Price. On August 7, Archbishop Lewis issued a writ of inhibition against McNeley (suspending him from the exercise of his office), alleging that McNeley had struck Bishop Joseph Deyman at the meeting and thereby excommunicated himself.  On August 19, Lewis charged the five with "invasion of the patrimony of the metropolitan" and issued writs of inhibition against the rest of the group.

On August 28, the ACC's Provincial Court ruled that Cahoon was Senior Bishop Ordinary, and when Lewis died on September 23, 1997, Cahoon assumed the role of Acting Metropolitan.  He was succeeded by a new Metropolitan, Bishop Michael Stephens, elected by a biennial provincial synod in Norfolk, Virginia on October 15.  Meanwhile, the five dissenting bishops met as another synod in Allentown, Pennsylvania, and elected Bishop Hamlett as Metropolitan.

By 1999, the dissenting bishops had separated into groups forming two new churches, the Holy Catholic Church Western Rite, friendly to Eastern Orthodox theology and skeptical about Anglicanism's doctrinal comprehensiveness, and the Holy Catholic Church Anglican Rite, following traditional Anglo-Catholic theology.

2010 reunion attempt
In March 2010, the bishops of the Holy Catholic Church Western Rite and the Holy Catholic Church Anglican Rite entered into full communion as one church, but retaining both names, in addition to a third name, Anglican Rite Catholic Church, with Bishop Kleppinger as Metropolitan.

At the time of the 2010 union, these dioceses were reported:
 Diocese of the Holy Trinity and Great Plains
 Diocese of the Pacific and Southwest
 Diocese of the Resurrection
 Diocese of Litoral Atlántico (South America)
 Missionary Diocese of American Indian People
 Diocese of Europe
 Diocese of Umzi Wase Tiyopiya (Africa)

By the end of 2010, however, the HCC-AR magazine Koinonia had dropped references to Kleppinger from its pages and Bishop Leo Michael, in an editorial, had criticized suggestions of diluting the Anglican identity of HCC-AR through "Western Rite" approaches.

Leadership

The Diocese of the Holy Trinity and Great Plains
The Rt. Rev. J. Leo Michael, Bishop Ordinary

Missionary Jurisdiction of India
The Rt. Rev. Edmund Jayaraj, Missionary Bishop

Province of South America
The Rt. Rev. Luis Carlos Garcia Medina, Bishop Ordinary
The Rt. Rev. Fray Juan de Jesus Torres, Assisting Bishop

Monastic Communities

The Third Order of Saint Francis
The Rev. Jay Rice, Father Guardian

A Third order within the Franciscan movement of the Holy Catholic Church (Anglican Rite), originally founded by St. Francis of Assisi.  The Orders of Saint Francis in the Anglican Rite Catholic Church are a continuation of the Orders brought to the British Isles in 1224, by Agnellus of Pisa. In 1976, this order was continued under the organization of The Rt. Rev'd Frank Knutti.

Publications

Koinonia
The Provincial newsletter for the Holy Catholic Church (Anglican Rite) called, "Koinonia" is published quarterly by St. James Anglican Church (Diocese of the Holy Trinity and the Great Plains).

References

External links
 

Continuing Anglican denominations
Christian denominations established in the 20th century
Christian organizations established in 1999
Anglo-Catholicism